Bulpitt & Sons Ltd was an electrical goods manufacturer and limited company in Birmingham, England, established as a brass founder in the late 19th century.

In the early 20th century the company registered The "Swan Brand" name.

In the 1920s, the company began manufacturing domestic electrical appliances including kettles and irons. They developed the first submersible electric heating element.

In the 1970s, the company became a subsidiary of BSR (Housewares) Ltd., originally Birmingham Sound Reproducers, manufacturers of turntables for playing records.

The rival French company Moulinex acquired the Swan Brand in 1988 and Bulpitt & Sons (Swan Brand) Ltd was eventually dissolved on 21 May 1989, just short of a century after the company's foundation.

See also
Teasmade

References

Defunct companies based in Birmingham, West Midlands
Defunct manufacturing companies of the United Kingdom
Home appliance manufacturers of the United Kingdom
Manufacturing companies based in Birmingham, West Midlands